The Sud-Est or SNCASE SE-2100, sometimes known as the Satre SE-2100 after its designer, was a tailless, pusher configuration touring monoplane with a single engine and cabin for two. Only one was built.

Design and development
The SE-2100 was designed by Pierre Satre, later the chief designer of the Concorde, as a response to a 1943 specification by the Vichy French Air Ministry for a two-seat touring aircraft. An all-metal aircraft, it had a low, cantilever, straight tapered wing with 55° of sweep on the leading edge and 10.43° of dihedral. There were fixed leading edge slots and trailing edge ailerons but no conventional flaps. The wing tips carried large, rounded fins with rudder-like rear portions which only moved outwards; they were used differentially for yaw control and jointly as flaps.

The SE-2010 had a short, blunt-nosed nacelle-type fuselage with a cabin which could be configured to seat one centrally or two in side-by-side, dual control configuration. The seats were just aft of the leading edge, with a baggage compartment behind them.  Access was via deep, wide, forward hinged doors on both sides; to make this possible, a piece of the wing root leading edge was an integral part of each door.  A 140 hp (104 kW) Renault Bengali 4 four cylinder, inverted, inline engine was mounted in pusher configuration behind the cabin and air-cooled via a ventral scoop; it drove a two-blade propeller positioned just behind the trailing edge. The SE-2100's fixed, tricycle undercarriage had pneumatic shock absorbers and mainwheel brakes; the nosewheel was free-swivelling. At different times the undercarriage legs and wheels were unfaired or faired.

The SE-2010 flew for the first time on 4 October 1945. Despite demonstrating promising performance and showing high manoeuvrability when demonstrated at the 1946 Paris Air Show, no production followed, with the prototype surviving into the early 1950s.

Specifications

References

Bibliography
 
 
 

1940s French experimental aircraft
SE-2100
Sud-Est aircraft
Single-engined pusher aircraft
Tailless aircraft
Aircraft first flown in 1945